Frederick William Kean (10 December 1898 – 28 October 1973) was an English international footballer who played professionally as a right half for The Wednesday, Bolton Wanderers and Luton Town. Kean was born in Sheffield and won nine caps for England between 1923 and 1929. He captained the team once, against Luxembourg in 1927.

References

1898 births
1973 deaths
English footballers
England international footballers
Sheffield Wednesday F.C. players
Bolton Wanderers F.C. players
Luton Town F.C. players
English Football League players
English Football League representative players
Association football wing halves
Footballers from Sheffield
FA Cup Final players